The County Palatine of Tübingen was a state of the Holy Roman Empire in the medieval period. The dynasty, originally based in Nagold, managed to acquire extensive holdings over the course of their time in power, distinguishing themselves by founding a large number monasteries in their territories. By the time of the High Middle Ages, several factors contributed to their economic decline, including the expenses of keeping court and extravagant donations to the monasteries they founded. The line itself experienced fragmentation into numerous cadet branches, the longest-lasting of which were the Counts of Tübingen-Lichteck (until 1664) and the Counts of Montfort (1787).

History 
The oldest documented count of Nagold is Anselm of Nagoldgau the Elder, who is as recorded as possessing Kuppingen (modern Herrenberg-Kuppingen) in the year 966. He is followed by Anselm of Nagoldgau the Younger, who is mentioned in records from 1027 and 1048.

Between these two (the only two counts designated "of Nagoldgau") a certain Count Hugo I of Nagold, presumably from the same family, appears in 1007, when he was invested with the royal estates of Holzgerlingen and the Imperial forest at Schönbuch.

The city of Tübingen first appears in official records in 1191, and the local castle, Hohentübingen, has records going back to 1078 (as "castrum Twingia") when it was besieged by Henry IV, King of Germany in the context of the Investiture Controversy. Hugo III (who also founded Blaubeuren Abbey in 1066) would nevertheless submit to the king the following year.   

From 1146, Hugo V (1125-1152) would bear the title of count palatine (Pfalzgraf), as Hugo I of Tübingen. This promotion is presumably due to services rendered to Conrad III, the first Hohenstaufen king of Germany, elected in 1138. By that point, the office of count palatine was no longer tied to its original task of maintaining a royal palace (whence the term “palatine”), but instead indicated that the holder exercised a certain degree of power and authority as the king's official representative within a stem duchy, making Hugo second only to the Duke of Swabia. As count palatine, he was also granted the right to exercise judicial powers in the king's stead, in addition to hunting rights, the right to collect customs, and the right to mint coins – as demonstrated by the Tübingen pfennig, which appears starting in 1185.

Hugo II (1153–82) gained Bregenz and other property in Raetia Curiensis, Tettnang and Sigmaringen by marriage to Elizabeth of Bregenz. In 1171, Hugo II founded Marchtal Abbey, and his first son Rudolph I would go on to found Bebenhausen Abbey in 1183. Rudolph also acquired Gießen via marriage to Matilda, countess of Gleiburg, which would later be sold to the landgraves of Hesse in 1264. Hugo's second son founded the Montfort dynasty, as Hugo I, Count of Montfort (d. 1230).

Upon the death of Rudolph I, his and Matilda's eldest son Rudolph II (1224-1247) became ruler of Horb, Herrenberg, and Tübingen. Their second son William would go on to found the Asberg-Gießen-Böblingen line. Rudolph II's son, originally Rudolph III of Tübingen, started what would be known as the Herrenberg Line, as Rudolph I of Scheer (d. 1277).

Decline 
By the early 1300s, Count Palatine Gottfried I ("Götz") was deeply in debt to Bebenhausen Abbey. He signed over extensive rights to the abbey, even transferring control of Böblingen and Calw. In 1311, Henry VII placed the imperial ban on Count Eberhard I of Württemberg, and   Gottfried was appointed Feldhauptmann in the imperial army, defeating Eberhard in May of that year. In a show of gratitude, the city of Esslingen assumed Gottfried's debts to the abbey, and he was able to recover the two towns.

Before long, however, his sons and his grandson Gottfried III would find themselves so deep in debt that they would enter into another debt-relief agreement, this time with the city of Tübingen, with Ulrich III, Count of Württemberg (Eberhard's son) acting as guarantor. For a nine-year period, the city would enjoy a wide range of privileges, including the right to elect their own Amtmänner (bailiffs) and to determine how their tax revenues were to be distributed. But in 1342, Gottfried found himself in conflict with Ulrich. Ordered by Emperor Louis the Bavarian to make full restitution, he was forced to sell Tübingen to Ulrich for 20,000 gold hellers.

Throughout the Middle Ages, the individual branches of the dynasty died out one after another: Horb by 1293, Asberg after 1357, Böblingen by 1377, with Herrenberg lasting until 1677. The last male member of the family to bear the name was Johann Georg, illegitimate son of Conrad William of Tübingen-Lichteneck. He served the duke of Württemberg in the Thirty Years' War as commander of the defenses at Hohentübingen Castle. In 1677, he died with no male heirs.

After the county palatine was sold to the County of Württemberg (or donated to Bebenhausen Abbey), it has since been part of the Duchy of Württemberg (1495–1806), the Kingdom of Württemberg (1806–1918), the Free People's State of Württemberg (1918–1945) and Baden-Württemberg (since 1952).

Coat of Arms 
The arms of the Counts Palatine of Tübingen always consist of the same basic design, but in different color combinations, representing the various branches of the family. The original coat of arms consists of a red three-tailed banner (gonfanon) with gold rings and fringes on a gold shield.

The counts of Montfort adopted the red banner from the original arms, but placed them on a silver shield instead of a gold one. This version is used as the arms of the Austrian state of Voralberg, and also appears as an escutcheon on the state flag.

The counts of Werdenberg, who split off from the Montfort line, used a black banner on silver, while  Werdenberg-Vaduz used a silver banner on black, and Werdenberg-Sargans a silver banner on red. The latter are featured in the arms of House Fürstenberg, having been acquired by the counts of Fürstenberg after the extinction of the Werdenberg-Sargans-Trochtelfingen line.

The arms of the County Palatine of Tübingen – or its cadet branches – have been displayed in the arms of several locations throughout the region, including Tübingen, Herrenberg, Böblingen, and Horb. While Horb later adopted the Hohenberg arms, the other towns have retained them to this day. Herrenberg reversed the colors, with a gold banner on a red shield. As for Tübingen, a pair of crossed arms holding antlers were added above the shield by Duke Ulrich of Württemberg in 1514.

Genealogy 
Note: The following lists have been simplified. It does not include persons who died young or who otherwise had no impact on the overall course of the family's history. 
 Hugo I of Tübingen (= Hugo V of Nagold), (†ca. 1152), shortly before 1146 promoted to Count Palatine of Swabia, ∞ Hemma of Zollern, daughter of Frederick I, Count of Zollern
 Frederick, Count Palatine of Tübingen, 1152-1162
 Hugo II (1115-1182), Count Palatine of Tübingen 1152-1182, ∞ Elizabeth, Countess of Bregenz, heir to Bregenz, Montfort, and Sigmaringen; daughter of Rudolph I, Count of Bregenz
 Rudolph I (1160-1219), Count Palatine of Tübingen 1182-1219; founded Bebenhausen Abbey in 1183;  ∞ Matilda, Countess of Gleiburg, heir of Gießen
 Rudolph II (†1247), Count Palatine of Tübingen, Vogt of Sindelfingen
 Hugo IV (†1267), Count Palatine of Tübingen, Count of Horb, founder of the Horb line
 Rudolph (*1259; †1280), member of the Teutonic Order
 Ludwig, Count of Horb; after his death, Horb was acquired by the Counts of Hohenberg via marriage to his sister
 Liutgard ∞ Burkhard IV of Hohenberg
 Rudolph I "der Scheerer" (†1277), Count of Tübingen in Herrenberg, founder of the Herrenberg line
 Eberhard (†1304), Count Palatine of Tübingen; sold Tübingen to the Böblingen line in 1294
 Rudolph II "der Scheerer" (†1317), Count of Tübingen in Herrenberg
 According to some sources, Conrad I "der Scheerer" (†1376), Count of Herrenberg
 Conrad II (†1391), Count of Herrenberg; sold Herrenberg to Württemberg in 1382
 Anastasia of Tübingen, abbess of St. Margarethen Abbey in Waldkirch 
 William (†1252), Count of Asperg-Gießen-Böblingen (the "Asperg Line")        
 Rudolph IV (†1271), Count of Böblingen
 Gottfried I (†1316), Count of Böblingen, Count Palatine of Tübingen, ∞ Elizabeth of Fürstenberg 
 William (†1327), Count Palatine of Tübingen
 Gottfried II (†1369), Count Palatine of Tübingen; sold Tübingen to Württemberg in 1342; inherited Lichteneck via his wife, founding the Tübingen-Lichteneck line (see below)
 Agnes ∞ Ulrich of Rechberg The Elder
 Ulrich I (†1283), Count of Asperg; sold Gießen to the Landgraves of Hesse in 1264
 Ulrich II (†1341), Count of Beilstein; sold Asperg to Württemberg in 1340; ∞ Anna, Countess of Löwenstein, heir of Beilstein
 William (†1357); sold Beilstein to Württemberg in 1340
 Hugo III of Tübingen (Hugo I of Montfort, 1185–1228/30), Count of Bregenz and Montfort, founder of the Montfort Line, from which arose the Werdenberg Line
 Henry of Tübingen (* ca. 1118, †7 April 1167 in an epidemic in Italy)

Tübingen-Lichteneck Line 
 Gottfried II (†1369), Count Palatine of Tübingen, sold Tübingen to Württemberg in 1342, but retained the title of "Count of Tübingen"; via his marriage to Clara of Freiburg, he would become lord of Lichteneck
 Conrad I (†1414), Count of Lichteneck
 Margaretha ∞ Hesso, Margrave of Baden
 Conrad II (†1449), Count of Lichteneck
 Rudolf "of Scheer" (*1414)
 Conrad [III] (†1477), Count of Lichteneck; ∞ Anna, Countess of Lupfen
 George I (†1507), Count of Tübingen, Lord of Lichteneck
 Conrad III (†1569), Count of Tübingen, Lord of Lichteneck
 Conrad IV (†1569), Count of Tübingen, Lord of Lichteneck; after 1536 Lord of Lichteneck and Limburg
 Agathe, Countess of Tübingen, ∞ Eberhard, Count of Hohenlohe († 5 March 1570)
 George III (†1570 in a fire at Waldenburg Castle during Carnival), Count of Lichteneck, ∞ Walpurg, Countess of Erbach
 Eberhard (*1573, †14 September 1608), Count of Lichteneck, Councillor for the Duchy of Württemberg; starting in 1587, Obervogt of the Black Forest
 George Eberhard († 9 September 1631), Count of Lichteneck
 Conrad William (†1630), Count of Tübingen-Lichteneck
 Elizabeth Bernhardine (*11 October 1624; † 4 November 1666) ∞ Charles, Count of Salmburg-Neuburg, who would inherit Lichteneck and then sell it in 1664
 Albericus (*1573, †25 October 1592 – killed by guards in Strasbourg)
 George II, Count of Tübingen (died unmarried)
 Henry, Teutonic Knight
 John, Teutonic Knight
 Margaret, abbess of Buchau (*1496)

References 
Ludwig Schmid: Geschichte der Pfalzgrafen von Tübingen, nach meist ungedruckten Quellen, nebst Urkundenbuch. Ein Beitrag zur schwäbischen und deutschen Geschichte [History of the Counts Palatine of Tübingen : according to mostly unprinted sources and historic documents; a contribution to Swabianand German history]. Bavarian State Library: Fues, Tübingen 1853 .
 Gerhard Köbler: Historisches Lexikon der deutschen Länder 2nd ed.,  Beck, München 1989.
 Decker-Hauff, Hansmartin / Quarthal, Franz [eds.]: Die Pfalzgrafen von Tübingen. Städtepolitik - Pfalzgrafenamt - Adelsherrschaft im Breisgau, Sigmaringen 1981.

Notes

Tübingen
Counties of the Holy Roman Empire
States and territories established in the 11th century
1342 disestablishments